Xihe District is a district of Fuxin City, Liaoning province, People's Republic of China.

Administrative Divisions
There are six subdistricts and one town within the district.

Subdistricts:
Xiyuan Subdistrict, Beiyuan Subdistrict, Dongyuan Subdistrict, Xueyuan Subdistrict, Huadong Subdistrict, Zhongyuan Subdistrict

The only town is Sihe

References

External links

County-level divisions of Liaoning